Jazz Lab is an album by American jazz saxophonist Gigi Gryce and trumpeter Donald Byrd featuring tracks recorded in 1957 and released on the Jubilee label.

Reception

Allmusic awarded the album 3 stars.

Track listing
All compositions by Gigi Gryce except as indicated
 "Blue Lights" - 4:00
 "Onion Head" (Donald Byrd) - 4:44 
 "Isn't It Romantic" (Richard Rodgers, Lorenz Hart) - 4:51
 "Bat Land" - 7:05  
 "Bangoon" (Hank Jones) - 4:57  
 "Imagination" (Jimmy Van Heusen, Johnny Burke) - 5:40   
 "Xtacy" (Byrd) - 8:32

Personnel 
Gigi Gryce - alto saxophone - except 3 
Donald Byrd - trumpet - except 6 
Hank Jones - piano
Paul Chambers - bass
Art Taylor - drums

References 

1958 albums
Gigi Gryce albums
Donald Byrd albums
Jubilee Records albums